Jaguar is a 1956 American adventure film directed by George Blair and written by John Fenton Murray and Benedict Freedman. The film stars Sabu, Chiquita Johnson, Barton MacLane, Jonathan Hale, Mike Connors and Jay Novello. The film was released on January 20, 1956, by Republic Pictures.

Plot
Two Americans are hired for an expedition into a dangerous South American (Motilone) area. Mystery, adventure, and drama weave through the film as Americans face some fearsome Motilone Jaguar worshiping warriors.  Family members reunite, and people die as the deceptive crew search for oil.

Cast       
Sabu as Juano
Chiquita Johnson as Rita
Barton MacLane as Steve Bailey
Jonathan Hale as Dr. Powell
Mike Connors as Marty Lang 
Jay Novello as Tupi
Fortunio Bonanova as Francisco Servente
Nacho Galindo as Garcia Solimos
Rodd Redwing as Porter #1 
Pepe Hern as Jorge
Raymond Rosas as Motilon Boy

References

External links 
 

1956 films
American adventure films
1956 adventure films
Republic Pictures films
Films directed by George Blair
1950s English-language films
1950s American films
American black-and-white films